John William Edward Spilsbury (born 27 October 1933) is a former English cricketer. A right-arm fast-medium bowler and right-handed batsman, he played only once at first-class level, when he appeared for Worcestershire against the Combined Services at New Road in 1952.

He is the grandson of England footballer and fellow Worcestershire cricketer Fred Wheldon.

Notes

References
 
 

English cricketers
Worcestershire cricketers
Living people
1933 births
Sportspeople from Worcester, England